Ouled Gacem  is a town and commune in Oum El Bouaghi Province, Algeria. According to the 1998 census it has a population of 6,273.

References

Communes of Oum El Bouaghi Province
Cities in Algeria
Algeria